Joseph Aspinall (1854 – May 7, 1939) was an American lawyer and politician from New York.

Life
He graduated from Columbia Law School in 1875. He was admitted to the bar, and practiced in Brooklyn.

He was a member of the New York State Assembly (Kings Co., 11th D.) in 1888, 1889 and 1891.

He was a member of the New York State Senate (3rd D.) in 1892 and 1893.

He was a Kings County Judge from 1896 to 1906; and a justice of the New York Supreme Court (2nd D.) from 1907 to 1924.

He died on May 7, 1939, at the Bushwick Hospital in Brooklyn.

Sources
The New York Red Book compiled by Edgar L. Murlin (published by James B. Lyon, Albany NY, 1897; pg. 404 and 506ff)
New York State Legislative Souvenir for 1893 with Portraits of the Members of Both Houses by Henry P. Phelps (pg. 8) [with portrait]
Biographical sketches of the members of the Legislature in The Evening Journal Almanac (1892)
KINGS COUNTY'S JUDGES-ELECT in NYT on December 10, 1895
JOSEPH ASPINALL, EX-JUSTICE, DEAD in NYT on May 9, 1939 (subscription required)

1854 births
1939 deaths
Republican Party New York (state) state senators
Politicians from Brooklyn
Republican Party members of the New York State Assembly
Columbia Law School alumni
New York Supreme Court Justices